Nathanael Greene Herreshoff (March 18, 1848 – June 2, 1938) was an American naval architect, mechanical engineer, and yacht design innovator. He produced a succession of undefeated America's Cup defenders between 1893 and 1920.

Biography
Herreshoff was born on March 18, 1848, in Bristol, Rhode Island and was named after General Nathanael Greene. He was one of seven brothers.

He graduated from the Massachusetts Institute of Technology in 1870 with a three-year degree in mechanical engineering. After graduation, he took a position with the Corliss Steam Engine Company in Providence, Rhode Island.

In 1878 Herreshoff returned to Bristol where he and one of his brothers, John Brown Herreshoff (1841–1915), who was blind, formed the Herreshoff Manufacturing Company. Nathanael provided the engineering expertise and John provided the business expertise, managing the firm's personnel and interacting with clients. Together, they grew the business from about 20 employees to over 400. Herreshoff’s talent for innovation found expression in both design and light-construction techniques.
They built a variety of fast, steam-powered vessels and military craft. 
Having started its design since 1876, The Herreshoffs built the first torpedo spar boat for the U.S. Navy. Lightning, that was purchased for experimental evaluation in 1878.  

In 1885, Stiletto, a wooden torpedo boat with a length of 7.8 feets, 31 tons of displacement and a speed of 18.2 knots was launched at the Herreshoff Manufacturing Co. as a private speculation. It was purchased for the United States Navy under an Act of Congress dated 3 March 1887, and entered service in July 1887, attached to the Naval Torpedo Station in Newport Rhode Island. USS Stiletto was the Navy's first torpedo boat capable of launching self-propelled torpedoes. 

After a safety valve opened to release over-pressure, Herreshoff closed it so the boat could achieve its anticipated maximum speed. But a boiler exploded, fatally injuring a member of the crew. Consequently, Herreshoff lost his steam engineer's license.

Herreshoff was an accomplished sailor, and was inducted into the National Sailing Hall of Fame in 2011. Two of Herreshoff's sons, Sidney Dewolf Herreshoff and Lewis Francis Herreshoff, also became yacht designers.

He died on June 2, 1938, in Bristol, Rhode Island.

Yacht building

While the Herreshoff Manufacturing Company's early work centered on steam-powered vessels, by the 1890s the Herreshoffs turned to the design and construction of yachts for wealthy American clients, including Jay Gould, William Randolph Hearst, John Pierpont Morgan, Cornelius Vanderbilt III, Harold Stirling Vanderbilt, William Kissam Vanderbilt II, Harry Payne Whitney and Alexander Smith Cochran. Herreshoff boat production incorporated power tools that increased productivity at a high level of quality, using craftsmen that received the highest boat-builder wages in the state of Rhode Island.

Herreshoff was  noted as an innovative sailboat designer of his time. His designs ranged from the 12½, a 16-foot (12½ foot waterline) sailboat for training the children of yachtsmen, to the 144-foot America's Cup Reliance, with a sail area of 16,000 square feet. He received the first US patent for a sailing catamaran. The firm built the America's Cup winning Cup yachts Enterprise (1930), and Rainbow (1934), designed by Starling Burgess. Every winning America's Cup Yacht from 1893 to 1934 was built by the Herreshoff yard.

The 123-foot Defender featured steel-framing, bronze plating up to the waterline and aluminum topsides to achieve a lighter and faster boat. This combination of materials had been pioneered in the French fresh-water racing yacht Vendenesse, which had been described in a New York Times article and caught the attention of the Vanderbilt Americacup syndicate. In salt water, Defender was subject to galvanic corrosion, which limited its durability in water. Defender won the  America's Cup in 1895 over Lord Dunraven's Valkyrie III, and she was used as an effective trial-horse for Herreshoff's new Cup defender  Columbia in 1899.  She was broken up in 1901.

Those of the 2,000-plus designs by Herreshoff that survive are sought by connoisseurs of classic yachts. Herreshoff S-Class sailboats, designed in 1919 and built until 1941, are still actively raced in Narragansett Bay, Buzzards Bay and Western Long Island Sound (Larchmont, New York). His 12½ design of 1914 is still being built and raced in New England as well. The New York 30 is well regarded as a one-design racer/cruiser.

In the 1942 the shipyard built wooden hull APc-1-class small coastal transports to support the World War II demand for ships.

The Herreshoff Marine Museum preserves Herreshoff's legacy at the former site of the Herreshoff Manufacturing Co.

Notable vessels

Steam vessels
 Lightning—the US Navy's first purpose-built torpedo boat—a speed record breaking steam launch with a spar torpedo, 1876.
 Peruvian Torpedo boats in the War of the Pacific, (1879-1883).

Sailing vessels
In the last quarter of the 19th century, Herreshoff constructed a double-hulled sailing boat of his own design (US Pat. No. 189,459). The craft, Amaryllis, raced at her maiden regatta on June 22, 1876, and performed exceedingly well. Her debut demonstrated the distinct performance advantages afforded by catamarans over the standard monohulls. It was as a result of this event, the Centennial Regatta of the New York Yacht Club, that catamarans were barred from regular sailing classes, and this remained the case until the 1970s.

In 1892 he build Wee Win a ½ rater for Winifred Sutton, daughter of Sir Richard Sutton, 5th Baronet, whose yacht Genesta had been beaten in the 1885 America's cup by Puritan. Wee Win was very successful racing on the Solent, leading to several follow-up orders from British Yachtswomen and Yachtsmen.

Amaryllis – sailing catamaran, 1876
Tarantella – catamaran, 1877
Westward – racing yacht, 1910
 Helianthus III, 1924
 Herreshoff Bull's Eye
 Herreshoff 12½

America's Cup yachts
Herreshoff designed and built the following America's Cup contenders. All won the series against their challengers. Herreshoff was the helmsman of Vigilant.
 Vigilant, 1893 
 Defender, 1895
 Columbia, 1899 & 1901
 Reliance, 1903
 Resolute, 1920

Technical achievements

According to his son's biography, Herreshoff's achievements include:
Built the first torpedo boat for the U.S. Navy.
Developed bulb and fin keels for large boats.
Updated the sail track and slide.
Invented the crosscut sail, with panels running at right angles to the leech, in order to combat cotton canvas' tendency to distort under load.

See also

 Herreshoff Marine Museum

References

Bibliography

Herreshoff, Nathanael G. Recollections and Other Writings (Bristol, RI: Herreshoff Marine Museum)
Herreshoff, Nathanael G. and William Picard Stephens, annotated by John W. Streeter, Nathanael Greene Herreshoff, William Picard Stephens: Their Last Letters 1930-1938 (Bristol, RI: Herreshoff Marine Museum) 1998.

External links
 Herreshoff Marine Museum / America's Cup Hall of Fame

1848 births
1938 deaths
American yacht designers
Multihull designers
America's Cup yacht designers
American naval architects
MIT School of Engineering alumni
People from Bristol, Rhode Island
Herreshoff family
Engineers from Rhode Island